Attorney General Wilkinson may refer to:

Andrew Wilkinson (born 1957/58), Attorney General of British Columbia
David L. Wilkinson (fl. 1980s), Attorney General of Utah

See also
General Wilkinson (disambiguation)